SpinART Records was a New York City-based independent record label that released recordings by The Apples in Stereo, Clem Snide, Frank Black, and Michael Penn.

The label was started by Joel Morowitz and Jeff Price in 1991. SpinART filed for bankruptcy in April 2007 and went out of business.

As of 2013, Jeff Price is founder and CEO of digital music auditing company Audiam. Joel Morowitz is the owner of Ecstatic Electric Pro Audio.

Artists

Apollo Sunshine
The Apples in Stereo
Augie March
Eef Barzelay
Bis
Black Francis
Frank Black
The Boo Radleys
Bunny Summer
By Divine Right
Vic Chesnutt
The Church
Cinerama
Clem Snide
Creeper Lagoon
Cub
The Dambuilders
The Dears
Detachment Kit
Eels
Elf Power
Eyes Adrift
Jason Falkner
Fastbacks
The Flashing Lights
The Goldenrods
Bill Fox
Halo Bit
Hank Dogs
Head of Femur
Hockey Night
Holiday
Hot IQs
Bill Janovitz
John Doe Thing
KaitO
Tommy Keene
The Lilac Time
Lilys
Lotion
Lois Maffeo
The Magnetic Fields
Marbles
Mazarin
 Me (band)
MC Honky
The Minders
Nellie McKay
Monsterland
The Orange Peels
Michael Penn
Pere Ubu
Pixies
Poole
Poster Children
Regia
The Revelers
Small Factory
Soft Cell
Squatweiler
Suddenly, Tammy!
The Sunshine Fix
The Technical Jed
Throw That Beat in the Garbage Can
Trampoline
The Trash Can Sinatras
The Wedding Present
White Town
You Am I
Zeke Fiddler

See also 
 List of record labels

References

Defunct record labels of the United States
American independent record labels
Indie rock record labels
Record labels disestablished in 2007